William Eugene Burrows (November 30, 1945 – June 24, 2019), known professionally by his stage name Billy Drago, was an American television and film actor. Drago's films, in which he was frequently cast as a villain, included Clint Eastwood's western Pale Rider and Brian De Palma's The Untouchables. He also had recurring roles in the television series The Adventures of Brisco County, Jr. and Charmed.

Early life
Burrows was born in Hugoton, Kansas, the son of William Franklin Burrows Jr., and Gladys Marie Wilcox (1918–1990) on November 30, 1945. His maternal lineage was of Romany descent and his paternal lineage was Native American. He later took his grandmother's maiden name "Drago" as his stage name to avoid being confused with another actor. Growing up, his parents would drop him off at the movie theater often in their rural town.

After leaving high school he started out as a journalist for the Associated Press, and later became a popular voice on radio that took him first to Canada then to New York City. After a brief stint with a touring theater group, he worked as a stuntman at Boot Hill in Dodge City, Kansas. From there he went on to the University of Kansas. After finishing college, he joined an acting company.

Career
Drago began his acting career in 1979. His early films included No Other Love, Windwalker and the Jeff Bridges vehicle Cutter's Way. He went on to guest star in numerous television series, including Hill Street Blues, Moonlighting, Walker Texas Ranger and Trapper John, M.D..

The role that brought his career international prominence was as the gangster assassin Frank Nitti in Brian De Palma's 1987 blockbuster The Untouchables. Subsequently, Drago appeared in numerous films and television series including The X-Files and a recurring role as outlaw John Bly in The Adventures of Brisco County, Jr.

In 1999 he began playing the demon Barbas in the WB series Charmed. Barbas was originally written as a villain of the week (in the episode "From Fear to Eternity"), but proved so popular with fans that he ultimately appeared in five of the show's eight seasons.

Drago was also featured in Michael Jackson's 2001 music video "You Rock My World,” and played a mysterious stranger who gives a boy a special key in the Mike + The Mechanics music video for "Silent Running (On Dangerous Ground)". Other notable projects include Gregg Araki's 2004 film Mysterious Skin, Pale Rider, the 2006 version of The Hills Have Eyes, Low Down, and Takashi Miike's Masters of Horror episode "Imprint", which Showtime chose not to air in the United States due to its "disturbing content."

Personal life 
Drago was married to actress Silvana Gallardo from 1980 until her death in 2012. He had two sons, Derrick Burrows and Darren E. Burrows, a fellow actor.

Death
Drago died from complications following a stroke in Los Angeles on June 24, 2019. He was 73.

Filmography

References

External links
 
 Billy Drago interview at The Void
 
 
 Billy Drago(Aveleyman)

1945 births
2019 deaths
20th-century American male actors
21st-century American male actors
American male film actors
American male television actors
American people of Romani descent
Male actors from Kansas
Native American male actors
People from Stevens County, Kansas
University of Kansas alumni